The Grange is a former military installation in Edge Lane, Liverpool.

History
The Grange, which was then an old sandstone farmhouse, was acquired by the War Office in 1900 for use as the regimental headquarters of an artillery regiment. During the First World War it was home to the 349th (4th West Lancashire) Howitzer Brigade and during the Second World War it was home to the 59th (4th West Lancashire) Medium Brigade. It was used by 4th Battalion, Parachute Regiment from 1993 until 1999. The Grange then became a museum for the Liverpool Scottish regiment until it closed in 2008.

References

Barracks in England
Military history of Merseyside
Installations of the British Army